Ratfucking is an American slang term for political sabotage or dirty tricks, particularly pertaining to elections. It was brought to public attention by Bob Woodward and Carl Bernstein in the book which chronicled their investigative reporting of the Watergate scandal, All the President's Men (1974).

Origins
Woodward and Bernstein's account in All the President's Men reports that many Republican staffers—H. R. Haldeman (pre-1948), Donald Segretti (early 1960s), White House aide Tim Elbourne, Ronald Louis Ziegler, and Dwight Chapin—had attended the University of Southern California and participated in the highly competitive student elections there. At USC, future Watergate scandal participants Chapin, Ziegler, Elbourne, Segretti, Gordon Strachan and Herbert Porter were members of Trojans for Representative Government. United Press International reporter Karlyn Barker sent Woodward and Bernstein a memo, "Notes On the USC Crowd", that outlined the connection. Fraternities, sororities, and underground fraternal coordinating organizations—such as Theta Nu Epsilon and their splintered rival "Trojans for Representative Government"—engaged in creative tricks and underhanded tactics to win student elections. Officially, control over minor funding and decision-making on campus life was at stake, but the positions also gave bragging rights and prestige. The tactics were either promoted by or garnered the interest of major political figures on the USC board of trustees, such as Dean Rusk and John A. McCone. The young operators called these practices ratfucking.

Usage
The term received media attention in Australia after it was reported that Prime Minister Kevin Rudd used the term in a speech at the 2009 Copenhagen Climate Change Summit.

During the 2016 Republican Party presidential primaries, candidate Ted Cruz said "Trump may be a rat, but I have no desire to copulate with him", a euphemized reference to the term.

In August 2017, journalist Marcy Wheeler received the disapproval of the FCC when she used the term in a radio broadcast. Wheeler maintained that the word has become a term of art in political science and is thus not an obscenity; FCC officials disagreed.

A more benign use of the term "ratfucking" was commonplace in Southern California (and possibly other) college slang from the late 1950s to at least the early 1960s, meaning a prank. Around that time, Tony Auth was the cartoonist for the Daily Bruin. One of his cartoons showed a large, inebriated rat suggesting to another rat, "Let's go PF-ing tonight!", a play on ratfucking or "RF-ing". The lead story in the January 6, 1961, California Tech, Caltech's student newspaper, was headlined, "Tech Scores First Televised RF". The article chronicled the Great Rose Bowl Hoax, which had just taken place. A political context was irrelevant to such usage. At the end of the article, an Editor's Note both explained and bowdlerized: "RF (for Royal Flush) is a contemporary college colloquialism for a clever prank."

The term ratfucking (rat in this case is shorthand for ration) is a slang term used by U.S. military personnel to describe the targeted pillaging of Meal, Ready-to-Eat (MRE) field rations, which the military officially calls "field stripping". It refers to the process of opening a case of MREs (which are packed 12 in a box), opening up individual MRE packages, removing the desired items, and leaving the unenticing remainder.

On May 23, 2019, scholar Svetlana Lokhova filed a claim in the United States District Court for the Eastern District of Virginia against Stefan Halper, claiming that "Stefan Halper is a ratfucker and a spy" with a footnote that "ratfucking" is a well-known political term.

After the results of the 2020 presidential election were called for Joe Biden and Donald Trump refused to concede, John Oliver, host of Last Week Tonight with John Oliver, said on one of his shows following the set up of the Trump voter fraud hotline that "a political term for election shenanigans is rat[s fucking]. So if you, say, happen to have any access to images of Pennsylvania-based rats fucking, it's frankly your patriotic duty to send them to the Trump campaign straight away." While saying this, Oliver displayed an image of rats engaged in sexual intercourse and the online link to the voter fraud hotline's website.

References 

American slang
Political terminology of the United States
English profanity
Watergate scandal